Summer Sampler may refer to:

 Summer Sampler (See You Next Tuesday EP), 2005
 Summer Sampler (Echosmith EP), 2013